The Mercyhurst Lakers represented Mercyhurst University in CHA women's ice hockey during the 2017-18 NCAA Division I women's ice hockey season.

Standings

Roster

Schedule

|-
!colspan=12 style=""| Regular Season

|-
!colspan=12 style="background:#0a2351; "| CHA Tournament
 
 
|-
!colspan=12 style="background:#0a2351; "| NCAA Tournament

Awards and honors

Vilma Tanskanen was named to the CHA All-Conference First Team.
Maggie Knott was named to the Second All-Conference Team.
Goaltender Kennedy Blair was named an All-Conference Rookie and won the CHA Goaltender Trophy.
Michael Sisti was awarded the CHA Coach of the Year award, as well as one of seven finalists for the NCAA Coach of the Year laurels.

References

Mercyhurst
Mercyhurst Lakers women's ice hockey seasons
Mercy
Mercy